Hua Hsu (born 1977) is an American writer and academic, based in New York City. He is a professor of English at Bard College and a staff writer at The New Yorker. His work includes investigations of immigrant culture in the United States, as well as public perceptions of diversity and multiculturalism. He is the author of A Floating Chinaman: Fantasy and Failure Across the Pacific. His second book, Stay True: A Memoir, was published in September 2022.

Early life 
A second-generation Taiwanese American, Hsu was born in 1977 in Champaign-Urbana, Illinois before moving to Plano, then Richardson, Texas. His family moved to southern California, then ultimately Cupertino, California, where his father was an engineer; his mother stayed at home with Hua. The family lived in Cupertino from about the time Hua was 9 to 18, though his father moved to Taiwan to pursue work and Hua often spent summers and other school vacations there. 

Hsu attended college at the University of California, Berkeley, where he studied political science. He graduated in 1999. He next attended Harvard University to study Asian-American literature, earning a PhD in the History of American Civilization in 2008. Louis Menand advised his dissertation, entitled Pacific Crossings: China, the United States, and the Transpacific Imagination.

Career 
Hsu was a tenured associate professor of English and director of American Studies at Vassar College until 2022, when he became professor of English at Bard College. Since 2017, he has also been a staff writer at The New Yorker. His work includes investigations of immigrant culture in the United States, as well as public perceptions of diversity and multiculturalism. Other research work and interests include studies of literary history and arts criticism.

Hsu has been a fellow at New America, a public policy think tank and a contributor to The New Yorker, The Atlantic, Slate, and The Wire. His 2012 essay for Lucky Peach about suburban Chinatowns was nominated for a 2012 James Beard Award for food writing. He is a board member of the Asian American Writers' Workshop. His book, A Floating Chinaman: Fantasy and Failure Across the Pacific, was published in June 2016 by Harvard University Press. He was a 2016 National Fellow for the New America Foundation.

Hsu's second book, Stay True: A Memoir, about an important friendship he had while in college, was published by Doubleday on September 27, 2022. It received a starred review in Publishers Weekly. Jennifer Szalai of The New York Times wrote, "Hsu is a subtle writer, not a showy one; the joy of 'Stay True' sneaks up on you, and the wry jokes are threaded seamlessly throughout." The book was named one of the "10 Best Books of 2022" by The New York Times and The Washington Post. The book was a finalist for the 2023 National Book Critics Circle award in autobiography.

Personal life 
Hsu lives in Brooklyn. He is married with a son.

Bibliography

Books

Essays and reporting
 
 
 
 
 
 
 
 
 
 
 
 
 
 
 
 
———————
Notes

See also
 Chinese people in New York City
 New Yorkers in journalism
 Taiwanese people in New York City
 The Hanging on Union Square by H. T. Tsiang, whom Hsu refers to in A Floating Chinaman.

References

External links 
 Personal site

Living people
American academics of Taiwanese descent
American male writers
The New Yorker people
Vassar College faculty
Bard College faculty
Harvard University alumni
University of California, Berkeley alumni
Writers from California
Writers from Illinois
American music critics
Literary scholars
1977 births
American writers of Taiwanese descent